Fröken Frimans krig ("Miss Friman's War") is a Swedish drama television series that first aired on SVT in December 2013 for three episodes during the Christmas and New Years weekend. Sissela Kyle plays women's rights advocate Dagmar Friman, a fictitious version of Anna Whitlock, who in 1905 founded the consumer cooperative Svenska hem. The series is written by Pernilla Oljelund, and is based partly on the book Svenska Hem – en passionerad affär (2005) by Monika Björk and Eva Kaijser. Following the success of the series, the book was re-released in 2013 under the name Svenska Hem – Den sanna historien om Fröken Frimans krig. Fröken Frimans krig is directed by Mikael Hellström and produced by Maria Nordenberg. A second season aired in December 2015, again for the Christmas and New Years weekend, with three more episodes. A third season aired in December 2016, and the fourth season aired in December 2017, with three more episodes each.

The series has been aired in Iran, Mexico, and Slovenia as of December 2015.

Roles
 Sissela Kyle – Dagmar Friman
 Sofia Ledarp – Kinna Boman
 Frida Hallgren – Lottie Friman
 Maria Kulle – Emmy
 Lena T Hansson – Alma
 Emelie Wallberg – Tora Nilsson
 Kristoffer Berglund – Jon Oskarsson
 Gustaf Hammarsten – Axel Friman
 Ulla Skoog – Rut
 Allan Svensson – Frithiof Johannesson
 Emil Almén – Egon
 Suzanne Ernrup – Fru Zander
 Rolf Lassgård – Ruben Lehmann
 Edvin Ryding – Gunnar
 Nicole Gutniak – Ina
 Ann-Charlotte Franzén – Barnavårdskvinnan
 Henrik Norlén – Anders Lithner
 Sofia Rönnegård – Jungfru
 Douglas Johansson – Hennings doctor
 Per Svensson – Mauritz Collin
 Anders Johannisson – Fastighetsskötare
 Johannes Wanselow – Nordlund
 Claes Hartelius – Tore Berger
 Peter Carlberg – Veterinär
 Tobias Aspelin – Förrättare
 Erik Johansson – DN-redaktör
 Michael Petersson – Herr Nettelman
 Richard Ohlsson – Springpojken Kalle
 Magnus Krepper - Ernst Recke

Criticism and fiction
In the Sveriges Radio show Vetenskapsradion Historia (aired 8 May 2014), historian Anita du Rietz stated that the series inaccurately portrays the situation of women during the early 1900s, and also misrepresents the work of Anna Whitlock. According to du Rietz, women's working situation at the time was much better than what is shown in the series.

References

2013 Swedish television series debuts
Swedish drama television series
Sveriges Television original programming
Swedish-language television shows